James II (Catalan: Jaume II; Aragonese: Chaime II; 10 April 1267 – 2 or 5 November 1327), called the Just, was the King of Aragon and Valencia and Count of Barcelona from 1291 to 1327. He was also the King of Sicily (as James I) from 1285 to 1295 and the King of Majorca from 1291 to 1298. From 1297 he was nominally the King of Sardinia and Corsica, but he only acquired the island of Sardinia by conquest in 1324. His full title for the last three decades of his reign was "James, by the grace of God, king of Aragon, Valencia, Sardinia and Corsica, and count of Barcelona" (Latin: Iacobus Dei gratia rex Aragonum, Valencie, Sardinie, et Corsice ac comes Barchinone).

Born at Valencia, James was the second son of Peter III of Aragon and Constance of Sicily. He succeeded his father in Sicily in 1285 and his elder brother Alfonso III in Aragon and the other Spanish territories, including Majorca, in 1291. He was forced to cede Sicily to the papacy in 1295, after which it was seized by his younger brother, Frederick III, in 1296. In 1298 he returned Majorca to the deposed king of Majorca, a different James II, having received rights to Sardinia and Corsica from Pope Boniface VIII. On 20 January 1296, Boniface issued the bull Redemptor mundi granting James the titles of Standard-bearer, Captain General and Admiral of the Roman church.

Reign

1285–1298
He succeeded his father as King of Sicily in 1285.  Upon the death of his brother Alfonso III in 1291, he succeeded also to the throne of the Crown of Aragon. He spent May of that year in Catania, inspiring the local monk Atanasiu di Iaci to write the Vinuta di re Iapicu about his time there. By a peace treaty with Charles II of Anjou in 1296, he agreed to give up Sicily, but the Sicilians instead installed his brother Frederick on the throne.

Due to the fact that Frederick would not withdraw from the island, Pope Boniface VIII asked James II, along with Charles II of Naples, to remove him.  As an enticement to do this the Pope invested James II with the title to Sardinia and Corsica, as well as appointing him papal gonfalonier.  Because of his inability to disguise his apathy on the matter, he returned to Aragon. Frederick reigned there until his death in 1337.

By the Treaty of Anagni in 1295, he returned the Balearic Islands to his uncle James II of Majorca. In 1298, by the Treaty of Argilers, James of Majorca recognised the suzerainty of James of Aragon.

1298–1327

During the period that followed his return to Aragon, James II wanted to gain access to the Muslim world in the south, from which Castile restricted Aragon.  In order to achieve this goal, and assisted by his Admiral Don Bernat de Sarrià, Baron of Polop, he formed an alliance with the enemies of the adolescent king of Castile, Ferdinand IV.  James II wanted Murcia in order to give his kingdom access to Granada.  The allied forces entered from all directions in 1296, where James II was victorious in capturing Murcia and holding it until 1304.

In 1313, James II granted administrative and political autonomy to the Aran Valley, the legal details of which are described in a Latin manuscript called the Querimonia. The devolution of power was a reward for the Aranese pledging allegiance to James II in a dispute with the kingdoms of France and Majorca over control of the valley.

James was involved in the 1321 leper scare. He ordered the arrest and torture of French lepers seeking shelter in his realm, and adopted harsher policy towards native lepers.

Writing
It was probably during his reign at Sicily (1285–1291) that James composed his only surviving piece of Occitan poetry, a religious dansa dedicated to the Virgin Mary, Mayre de Deu. A contemporary, Arnau de Vilanova, wrote a verse-by-verse Latin commentary of the dansa in 1305. The metaphor James uses has been analysed by Alfred Jeanroy, who sees similarities in the Roman de Fauvel.

James begins by comparing the Church to a ship in a storm, poorly guided by its pilot (nauchier, i.e. the Pope):

The literary quality of the verses is neither astounding nor disappointing, but the song was clearly written at a moment when James was in conflict with the Papacy, perhaps with a propagandistic end, to prove his piety and fidelity to the Church if not the Papacy. The final verses ask Mary to protect him, the king, from sin:

Family

Marriages, concubines and children
He married four times:

— Isabella of Castile, Viscountess of Limoges, daughter of Sancho IV of Castile and his wife María de Molina. The wedding took place in the city of Soria, on 1 December 1291 when the bride was only 8 years old. The marriage, which was never consummated, was dissolved and annulled after Sancho's death in 1295, when James chose to change his alliances and take advantage of the turmoil inside Castile.

— Blanche of Anjou, daughter of his family's rival Charles II of Naples and Maria of Hungary. They married in the city of Villabertran, on 29 October or 1 November 1295. She bore him several children:

James (b. 29 September 1296 – d. Tarragona, July 1334). James renounced his right to the throne in 1319 to become a monk. He refused to consummate his marriage to Eleanor of Castille, who later become the second wife of his brother Alfonso.
Alfonso IV of Aragon (1299 – 24 January 1336). He became the King of Aragon in 1327 and ruled until his death. He married twice: first Teresa d'Entença and then Eleanor of Castile after his first wife died.
Maria (b. 1299 – d. as a nun in Sijena, 1347), wife of Peter, son of Sancho IV of Castile.
Constance (b. Valencia, 1 April 1300 – d. Castillo de Garcia Munoz, 19 September 1327), wife of Juan Manuel, Prince of Villena, nephew of Alfonso X of Castile.
John (b. 1304 – d. Pobo, Zaragoza, 19 August 1334). John became the first Archbishop of Toledo and Tarragona in 1318, and Patriarch of Alexandria in 1328.
Isabella of Aragon (b. 1305 – d. Styria, 12 July 1330), wife of Frederick I of Austria.
Peter (b. 1305 – d. Pisa, 4 November 1381), Count of Ribagorza, Empúries and Prades. Peter married Joan, daughter of Gaston I of Foix, they were parents to:
 Alphonse (b. 1332 - d. 5/7 March 1412), 1st Duke of Gandia, 1st Marquess of Villena de Castilla, 2nd Count of Ribagorza and Empúries, etc., Constable of Castile, married in 1355 Violante Ximénez de Arenós, daughter of Gonzalo Díez de Arenós, Baron of Arenós, and wife María or Juana de Cornell, had issue
 John (b. 1335, d. 1414), 2nd Count of Prades, Seneschal of Catalonia, married his sister-in-law Sancha Ximénez de Arenós, had issue
 Eleanor of Aragon, Queen of Cyprus.
Blanche (b. 1307 – d. Barcelona, 1348), Prioress of Sixena.
Ramon Berenguer (b. August 1308 – d. a priest at Barcelona, 1366), Count of Empúries and Baron of Ejerica. Ramon married Blanche, daughter of Philip I of Taranto, and then Maria, daughter of James of Aragon. His daughter Joan married Fernando Manuel, son of Juan Manuel, Prince of Villena
Violante (b. Barcelona, October 1310 – d. Pedrola, 19 July 1353). She first married Philip, Despot of Romania, son of Philip I of Taranto. Her second marriage was to Lope de Luna, Lord of Segorbe.

— Marie of Lusignan (1273 – April, 1319 at Tortosa, buried at Barcelona), daughter of the King Hugh III of Cyprus. They married by proxy in Santa Sophia, Nicosia, on 15 June 1315, and in person in the city of Girona, on 27 November 1315. This marriage was childless.

— Elisenda de Montcada, daughter of Pedro I de Montcada, Lord of Altona and Soses, and wife Gisela d'Abarca. They married in the city of Tarragona, on 25 December 1322. This marriage was childless, too, and, after the king's death, she entered the Poor Clares Monastery of Pedralbes as a nun, where she died on 19 June 1364.

In addition to his legitimate offspring, James had three natural children born with Sicilian women:

— With Gerolda:

Sancho (b. Sicily, 1287 – d. young?).
Napoleón (b. Sicily, 1288 – m. 1338), Lord of Joyosa Guarda (Gioiosaguardia) and Acquafredda (in Sardinia); married a daughter of a Majorcan named Guillermo Robert.

— With Lucrecia:

James (b. Mazzara, 1291 – d. 1350), Vicario di Cagliari (1317–1341); married firstly with Jaumetta Guerau, from Majorca, and secondly with Puccia, a Sardinian woman.

Effigy

Notes

References

Sources

Further reading
VanLandingham, Marta. Transforming the State: King, Court and Political Culture in the Realms of Aragon (1213–1387). Leiden [Netherlands]: Brill, 2002. 

|-

|-

|-

|-

1267 births
1327 deaths
13th-century Aragonese monarchs
14th-century Aragonese monarchs
13th-century Kings of Sicily
People from Valencia
Valencian monarchs
Monarchs of Majorca
Counts of Barcelona
13th-century Spanish troubadours
House of Aragon
House of Barcelona (Sicily)
Aragonese infantes
Captains General of the Church